The Caterham line is a railway branch line running from Caterham in Surrey to Purley in South London. It operates as a commuter service to London.

The line was opened by local promoters as the Caterham Railway in 1856 primarily to convey firestone from quarries south of Caterham. There was intense rivalry and suspicion between the two main line railway companies at Purley, the London, Brighton and South Coast Railway (LBSCR) and the South Eastern Railway (SER), and this led to both of them obstructing successful operation of the Caterham Railway. In any case the local population was sparse and agricultural in character, and the Caterham Railway was loss-making.

It was acquired by the SER in 1859, but it was not until the latter years of the nineteenth century that residential development made the commercial situation of the line more buoyant. The line was doubled and a programme of station and infrastructure improvements was completed by 1900. The line was electrified in 1928.

After many years allied to the South Eastern Division of British Railways, the line is now operated by the Southern train operating company; a half-hourly service to London Bridge is operated.

History

The main line to Redhill and Brighton
By an Act of Parliament of 1846 the London, Brighton and South Coast Railway was formed. It controlled the line from London Bridge to Brighton, but by Act of Parliament, it shared the line from London Bridge to Redhill with the South Eastern Railway, which turned east at Redhill and ran to Tonbridge and beyond.

Caterham Railway proposed
Local promoters put forward what became the Caterham Railway. The primary objective was the conveyance of firestone, an important refractory mineral, from quarries above Caterham; the population of the town was only 487 in 1851, so that passenger business was not expected to be dominant. The promoters of this line had applied to the LBSCR for a connection at Godstone Road, the contemporary name for Purley. At the time there was a territorial agreement in force, made in 1848 between the LBSCR and the SER, that neither company would construct or encourage the construction of a new line in the other company's area of influence. The London to Redhill railway line was taken to be the demarcation line. Accordingly the LBSCR asked the SER for their view on the proposal.

The SER evidently feared that the LBSCR would use the line to penetrate towards Tunbridge Wells, and it vehemently objected to the connection, and to any association between the LBSCR and the Caterham Railway. The latter got its authorising Act of Parliament on 16 June 1854 without any support from either of the larger companies.

On 3 November 1854 the LBSCR concluded another territorial agreement with the SER, this time nominating third-party companies with which it would not conclude agreements – companies that had been named in 1848, before the Caterham company was put forward. The Caterham Railway was therefore omitted from the list.

In June 1855 the SER offered to work the CR for two years and in December stipulated the same terms as had been offered to the Mid-Kent Railway but the CR refused them, and turned to the contractor, Samuel Morton Peto, to see if he would work the line, but he also refused to agree terms. The CR turned to the LBSCR, who agreed to stop some trains at the semi-derelict Godstone Road station. At the start of August 1858 the Railway Times (periodical) commented that the opening of the line had been delayed for a year due to "political" reasons.

Opening
The Caterham branch was ceremonially opened on 4 August 1856, and to the general public the following day. There were four passenger trains each way every weekday, three on Sundays, running only to and from Purley. The line was single track throughout. There had been constant difficulty from the two large companies throughout the period leading up to the hearing in Parliament and actual opening, and the sniping and obstruction continued unceasingly afterwards. 

There were four trains on weekdays, with two connecting services each being provided by the SER and the LBSCR respectively. There were intermediate stations at Coulsdon (renamed Kenley in October 1856) and Warlingham. Godstone Road was soon renamed Caterham Junction. The CR acquired an engine and two or three carriages on hire from the LBSCR to operate the service.

The station now called Purley had been Godstone Road prior to the opening of the line, when it became Caterham Junction. Its name was changed to Purley on 1 October 1888. For many years there was no direct running connection there, so that through passenger trains could not be run conveniently. As part of the obstructive tactics by the main line companies, good connections were not arranged at Purley.0 Kenley station was called Coulsdon until December 1856. The line was four miles and five furlongs (7.4 km) in length.

Continuing difficulty operationally and commercially
Both the LBSCR and the SER operated trains on the main line at Purley, but neither of the larger companies felt any special obligation to the Caterham Railway, and there were constant complaints that connections at Purley were poor or non-existent. The company took a case to the Court of Common Pleas, requesting that the larger companies should be obliged to make more connections, to introduce better through ticketing arrangements, and improve the station facilities at Purley. These ideas were turned down and the Company was left on its own. It decided to try to sell itself to one or other of the neighbouring companies, but the territorial agreement made that fraught.

In 1857 the Brighton company started to demand payment for rolling stock hire, that the Caterham Railway had not paid; the smaller company was working the line itself, but using locomotives and vehicles hired in form the LBSCR. The demand was ignored and the impasse escalated, with both the LBSCR and the SER threatening to suspend any co-operation whatsoever from 7 May 1857. A cheque for part of the debt was received just before that date, doing nothing to demonstrate good faith. In July 1857 the Caterham Railway communicated with the LBSCR saying that unless it took over the working, the Caterham Railway would cease operation, as it was loss-making. In fact in the first eleven months of operation, the Caterham Railway’s receipts had been £854, while working expenses were £1,700, before paying interest on bank loans.

There now followed a lengthy period of negotiation over the future. The LBSCR thought it advisable to purchase the Caterham Company, but the SER invoked the territorial agreement and objected. It considered acquiring the Caterham Railway itself, and offered terms that were harsh, although realistic in view of the Caterham’s commercial results. Now in July 1858 one of the contractors for the original construction of the Caterham line obtained a judgment against the company for payment of a debenture debt. This would enable the creditor to take possession of the land of the Caterham Railway and sell it, closing the line. A receiver was appointed, and he tried to sell the line to the SER, which was successfully done.

Taken over by the South Eastern Railway
The transfer was confirmed by Act of 21 July 1859. The sale was for £15,200 including settlement of an outstanding debt. The proprietors had expended £39,367 on building the line.

Chipstead Valley Railway
The Chipstead Valley Railway was incorporated in 1893 to run from Purley to Walton on the Hill, and an extension to Tattenham Corner. The Chipstead Valley line was opened to Kingswood on 2 November 1897 to Tadworth and Walton on the Hill on 1 July 1900 and to Tattenham Corner on 4 June 1901.

Caterham line improvements
The Caterham line was doubled in December 1895. The Brighton company was asked to improve the junction at Purley, and a full double junction with the mainline and a new platform were provided. Up to this time it had been of the ordinary roadside type, with a bay on the downside for Caterham branch trains. As rebuilt there were six through roads with a corresponding number of platform faces. A new Purley engine shed built by the South Eastern was also built costing nearly £10,000. Work started in 1897 and was completed by 1 January 1900.

The Brighton railway extended its quadrupling of the Brighton main line from South Croydon to Stoats Nest on 5 November 1899, and from there to Earlswood avoiding Redhill on 1 April 1900

Electrification
After the success of the initial electrification of its inner suburban network, the LBSCR decided in 1912 to extend the system to the outer suburban area. This was using its 6.7kV ac overhead system. As part of the scheme, it offered to incorporate the Caterham and Tattenham Corner lines of the South Eastern and Chatham Railway. Their trains ran to London Bridge and were therefore going to be under the wires for the majority of their journey.

In fact the formation of the Southern Railway as part of the Grouping process, following the Railways Act 1921, led to a change of plan. The overhead electrification would be abandoned, and the third rail dc system adopted by the London and South Western Railway would be used instead.

Electric operation of the Caterham branch started on Sunday 25 March 1928. There were 54 trains in each direction on weekdays; nearly all the electric trains combined or separated at Purley with Tattenham Corner trains; the trains generally ran to and from London Bridge.

The service was much more intensive than previously, and the Southern Railway terminated the Caterham line trains at London Bridge in the peak hours, rather than continuing to Charing Cross or Cannon Street, to avoid complex conflicting movements on the approaches to London Bridge.

After 1952 the South Eastern Division of British Railways implemented a widespread scheme to run ten-car trains in the outer suburban area. In many places this involved platform lengthening, although in the case of Caterham, only the Purley platforms required this attention, as the trains always divided at Purley with one portion going to each of Caterham and Tattenham Corner. This operation started in 1955.

Current train services 
The passenger train service (from 11 December 2022) is every thirty minutes from Caterham to London Bridge, seven days a week. The trains combine with a Tattenham Corner portion at Purley, and are operated by Southern.

Topography

Gradients
Caterham is located high in the hills and the line falls steeply from Caterham station to Purley, at a ruling gradient of 1 in 90 and 1 in 110.

Locations
 Caterham; opened 5 August 1856; new station 1 January 1900; still open;
 Helliloo Platform; opened about 1856; closed by 1899;
 Warlingham; opened 5 August 1856; renamed Whyteleafe South 11 June 1956; still open;
 Whyteleafe; opened 1 January 1900; still open;
 Coulsdon; opened 5 August 1856; renamed Kenley December 1856; still open;
 Godstone Road; opened 12 July 1841; closed 1 October 1847; reopened 5 August 1856 as Godstone Road Caterham Junction; altered to just Caterham Junction later in 1856; renamed Purley 1 October 1888; still open.

External links 

  History of the branch line

Notes

References

Rail transport in Surrey
Railway lines opened in 1856
Railway companies disestablished in 1859
Railway lines in London
Railway lines in South East England
Standard gauge railways in England
Transport in the London Borough of Croydon
British companies disestablished in 1859